Events in the year 1769 in India.

Events
National income - ₹9,897 million
 1st Mysore War, 1767–69.

References

 
India
Years of the 18th century in India